Merit Motion Pictures is an independent documentary film and television production company based in Winnipeg, Manitoba, Canada. It was founded by Merit Jensen Carr in 1988.

Specializing in factual, multi-platform entertainment, Merit Motion Pictures has regularly produced for CBC's human interest and science/nature documentary strands: Doc Zone, The Nature of Things, and documentary Channel. The company has also collaborated with broadcasters as diverse as ZDF/ARTE, CTV, Shaw, National Geographic, PBS, Smithsonian Channel, TVO and Animal Planet.

In 2009, Merit Motion Pictures' television documentary The Secret World of Shoplifting achieved the highest audience ratings in the history of CBC’s Doc Zone, and the 4 x one-hour series One Ocean won Best Cross-Platform/New Media Program at the 2011 Jackson Hole Wildlife Film Festival. Their 2011 feature documentary TuTuMuch screened in Cineplex Odeon theatres across Canada and around the world.

The company's television documentary Smarty Plants: The Secret World of Plant Behaviour won Best Direction in a Documentary Program or Series at the 2013 Canadian Screen Awards, and garnered two more nominations in the categories of Best Science or Nature Documentary Program or Series, and Best Sound in an Information/Documentary Program or Series.

Carr received the Don Haig Award in 2013, presented by the Hot Docs Board of Directors as a celebration of her contributions to Canadian filmmaking, and the lifetime achievement award at the Winnipeg’s Women Entrepreneur of The Year Awards in 2014.

Call of the Forest: The Forgotten Wisdom of Trees 
In 2015, Merit Motion Pictures co-produced Call of the Forest: The Forgotten Wisdom of Trees, a feature-length documentary with Irish-Canadian botanist, medical biochemist and author Diana Beresford-Kroeger as its main subject. Directed, shot, edited and co-produced by Peabody Award-winner Jeff McKay (https://www.jeffmckay.org/, Fat Chance, 40 Years of One Night Stands), the documentary follows Beresford-Kroeger as she visits the world's northern forests, exploring the many benefits of trees in sustaining human and ecological well-being.

Call of the Forest was given the Nature Award at the 2016 Cinema Verde Festival, and has played at other international festivals including Festival Pariscience in 2017, and Wild & Scenic Film Festival in 2018. The film was nominated for the Rob Stewart Award for Best Science or Nature Documentary Program or Series at the 2018 Canadian Screen Awards. It also screened at independent cinemas across Canada including the Winnipeg Cinematheque, where it broke a 30-year box office record for tickets sold. A one-hour version of the film aired on TVO in 2017.

Productions

Programs featuring the Royal Winnipeg Ballet:
TuTuMUCH theatrical documentary, shown by Cineplex Odeon and Hoyts Australia & New Zealand
Ballet High broadcast on Bravo!
40 Years of One Night Stands broadcast on Bravo!
Ballet Girls miniseries broadcast on Bravo!

References

 https://web.archive.org/web/20140308011158/http://specialedmovie.com/
 https://web.archive.org/web/20140308000929/http://www.hotdocs.ca/film/title/special_ed
 Diana Beresford-Kroeger
 http://dianasjourney.com/
 http://www.superchannel.ca/movies/view/49098585/Special-Ed
 http://www.cbc.ca/doczone/episodes/slaves-to-habit
 http://www.cbc.ca/doczone/episodes/faking-the-grade
 http://www.cbc.ca/natureofthings/episodes/ticked-off-the-mystery-of-lyme-disease
 http://www.cbc.ca/natureofthings/episodes/surviving-the-teenage-brain
 http://www.cbc.ca/natureofthings/episodes/smarty-plants-uncovering-the-secret-world-of-plant-behaviour
 https://www.imdb.com/title/tt2957732/
 http://meritmotionpictures.com/portfolio-items/vixens-virgins-and-other-mythological-creatures/
 http://www.cbc.ca/doczone/episodes/are-we-digital-dummies
 https://web.archive.org/web/20100328063322/http://oneocean.cbc.ca/
 https://web.archive.org/web/20100411075635/http://oneocean.cbc.ca/series/episodes/3-mysteries-of-the-deep
 https://web.archive.org/web/20100323015415/http://oneocean.cbc.ca/series/episodes/4-the-changing-sea
 http://www.tutumuchmovie.com/
 Tutu Much
 http://www.cbc.ca/doczone/episodes/the-secret-world-of-shoplifting
 http://meritmotionpictures.com/portfolio-items/ballet-high/
 http://www.cbc.ca/player/Shows/Shows/Doc+Zone/2008-09/ID/1233752062/
 http://www.cbc.ca/player/Shows/Shows/The+Nature+of+Things/ID/1236783691/
 https://web.archive.org/web/20140308004922/http://curio.ca/en/science-of-the-senses-touch/881
 http://recreatingeden.com/
 Recreating Eden
 http://www.icangarden.com/document.cfm?task=viewdetail&itemid=6124
 http://www2.nfb.ca/boutique/XXNFBibeCCtpItmDspRte.jsp?formatid=54919&lr_ecode=collection&minisite=10002&respid=22372
 https://www.imdb.com/title/tt1611999/combined
 https://web.archive.org/web/20140308000922/http://www.telefilm.ca/en/catalogues/production/ballet-girls
 https://www.imdb.com/title/tt1069258/
 https://web.archive.org/web/20140308001427/http://www.telefilm.ca/en/catalogues/production/haunts-black-masseur-swimmer-hero
 https://web.archive.org/web/20140308011750/http://saskatchewanhumanrights.ca/learn/videos/womens-issues
 http://www2.nfb.ca/boutique/XXNFBibeCCtpItmDspRte.jsp?formatid=33075&lr_ecode=collection&minisite=10004&respid=50409
 https://www.imdb.com/title/tt1509786/
 http://www.40yearsthemovie.com
 https://web.archive.org/web/20140308002124/http://knowledge.ca/program/the-royal-winnipeg-ballet-40-years-of-one-night-stands
 http://edgelandfilms.com/40-years-of-one-night-stands-the-story-of-canadas-royal-winnipeg-ballet/
 http://www.nsi-canada.ca/courses/nsi-aboriginal-documentary/faculty/
 http://docspace.ca/film/by-womans-hand

External links
Official site

Companies based in Winnipeg
Canadian companies established in 1988
Television production companies of Canada
Film production companies of Canada
Documentary film production companies
Cinema of Manitoba
1988 establishments in Manitoba